This is a list of monuments that are classified by the Moroccan ministry of culture around Essaouira.

Monuments and sites in Essaouira 

|}

References 

Essaouira
Essaouira